Kona Weather (コナ・ウェザー) is the third studio album by Kiyotaka Sugiyama, released by VAP on December 19, 1987. The album peaked at No. 2 on the general Oricon chart and at No. 1 on the LP chart.

The album was the first time Sugiyama was the sole composer for his album, with more songs focusing on romance than the summer and sea, which he is more known for.

Track listing

Charts

References 

1987 albums
J-pop albums